This is a list of people who awoke from coma like states, such as a persistent vegetative state, minimally conscious state, catatonic stupor, or locked-in syndrome after a lengthy period of time.

See also 
 Coma
 Karolina Olsson (1861–1950), a Swedish woman who allegedly hibernated for 32 years

References 

https://globalnews.ca/news/8997578/two-year-coma-woman-wakes-up-wanda-palmer/

Coma
Coma
People who awoke from permanent coma like states